Round Lake Township may refer to:

 Round Lake Township, Becker County, Minnesota
 Round Lake Township, Jackson County, Minnesota
 Round Lake Township, McHenry County, North Dakota, in McHenry County, North Dakota

Township name disambiguation pages